Claire Jones may refer to:
 Claire Jones (camogie)
 Claire Jones (harpist)